José Wellington Bento dos Santos (born 11 September 1973), known as Detinho, is a former Brazilian professional footballer who played as a striker. He also holds a Portuguese passport.

He spent his entire professional career in Portugal and Hong Kong, retiring in his 40s.

Club career

Portugal
Born in Sergipe, Detinho only started playing organised football well in his 20s. In 1997, he moved to Portugal where he remained the following nine years, starting with F.C. Paços de Ferreira in the second division and moving to SC Vianense of the third level after a few months.

Subsequently, Detinho represented U.D. Oliveirense and F.C. Marco in division three, his performances with the latter attracting the attention of Primeira Liga club S.C. Campomaiorense who purchased him for the 2000–01 season, and he responded by scoring eight goals in 29 games to finish team top-scorer, even though it was not good enough to prevent relegation.

Detinho signed with third-tier Leixões S.C. in late September 2001. He netted ten times in the league his first year, adding three in the club's historic run in the Taça de Portugal which ended in the 1–0 final loss against Sporting CP where he played the full 90 minutes. He repeated individual numbers the following campaign, helping to achieve promotion. 

After the previous domestic cup exploits, Detinho appeared with the Matosinhos side in the 2002–03 UEFA Cup, scoring in a 2–1 home win over PAOK FC in the first round (3–5 aggregate loss).

South China
Detinho joined South China AA in 2006 from Imortal DC, after the team gave up its "all-Chinese" policy. He had a very successful first season in the Hong Kong First Division League, being chosen South China Star of the Month three times (September, April and May), finishing second in the top scorers table and being selected in the Hong Kong Top Footballer Best XI; additionally, he was also voted his team's best player.

Career statistics

Club (Hong Kong only)

Honours
Marco
Portuguese Second Division: 1999–2000

Leixões
Portuguese Second Division: 2002–03
Taça de Portugal runner-up: 2001–02

South China
Hong Kong First Division League: 2006–07, 2007–08, 2008–09
Hong Kong Senior Challenge Shield: 2006–07
Hong Kong FA Cup: 2006–07
Hong Kong League Cup: 2007–08

Citizen
Hong Kong Senior Challenge Shield: 2010–11

References

External links

HKFA profile 

1973 births
Living people
Sportspeople from Sergipe
Brazilian footballers
Naturalized footballers of Hong Kong
Association football forwards
CR Vasco da Gama players
Primeira Liga players
Liga Portugal 2 players
Segunda Divisão players
F.C. Paços de Ferreira players
SC Vianense players
U.D. Oliveirense players
F.C. Marco players
S.C. Campomaiorense players
Leixões S.C. players
Imortal D.C. players
Hong Kong First Division League players
Hong Kong Premier League players
South China AA players
Hong Kong League XI representative players
Brazilian expatriate footballers
Expatriate footballers in Portugal
Expatriate footballers in Hong Kong
Brazilian expatriate sportspeople in Portugal
Brazilian expatriate sportspeople in Hong Kong